Ko Kha may refer to the following places in Lampang Province, Thailand:
Ko Kha District 
Ko Kha, Ko Kha, a village and subdistrict within Ko Kha District